Parkland Evangelical Church, also known as Greater Good Hope Baptist Church, is a historic church at 1102 S. 26th Street in Louisville, Kentucky. It was built in 1915 and added to the National Register in 1983.

According to its Kentucky Historic Resources Inventory evaluation, "The church is an excellent example of a Shingle style treatment with Gothic Revival motifs."

References

Baptist churches in Kentucky
Churches on the National Register of Historic Places in Kentucky
Churches completed in 1915
20th-century Baptist churches in the United States
Churches in Louisville, Kentucky
National Register of Historic Places in Louisville, Kentucky
Stick-Eastlake architecture in the United States
Gothic Revival church buildings in Kentucky
Shingle Style architecture in Kentucky